Vice-Admiral Lord Mark Robert Kerr (12 November 1776 – 9 September 1840) was an officer of the Royal Navy, the third son of William John Kerr, 5th Marquess of Lothian, by his wife, Elizabeth, daughter of Chichester Fortescue of Dromisken.

Biography
He was present at the capture of Minorca in 1798. On 2 November 1804, Horatio Nelson, himself quite ill, wrote to Lord Melville: '...I fear Lord M Kerr is falling into the same complaint [as I have]. I have now got him to the fleet and shall keep an Eye upon him for he is too valuable an Officer and good a Man to be lost for want of care.' In April 1805, Captain Mark Kerr discovered that the French Toulon fleet, sought by Nelson, were in the Atlantic and he passed this information on to Vice-Admiral John Orde, who relayed the message to England.

Lord Mark Robert Kerr married on 18 July 1799 Charlotte (11 February 1778 – 26 October 1835), third daughter of Randal William Macdonnell, sixth Earl, and Marquess of Antrim; she succeeded him as Countess of Antrim (creation of 1785) in her own right on the death of her elder sister. They had a large family, two of their sons succeeding as fourth and fifth Earls of Antrim.

References

1776 births
1840 deaths
Younger sons of marquesses
Royal Navy vice admirals
Royal Navy personnel of the French Revolutionary Wars